Talgai is a rural locality in the Southern Downs Region, Queensland, Australia. In the  Talgai had a population of 106 people.

Geography 
The locality of Ellinthorp is entirely contained within the boundaries of Talgai. This is quite unusual in Queensland which does not normally permit such a containment, requiring all localities to have at least two neighbours.

History 
The locality name derives from the pastoral run name established by G Gammie who arrived on the Condamine River with stock on 9 March 1841.

Talgai West Provisional School opened on 22 September 1902. On 17 April 1916 it became Talgai West State School. It experienced a number of temporary closures due to low student numbers. On 1 July 1920 it became a half-time provisional school in conjunction with Deuchar Provisional School (meaning a single teacher was shared between the two schools). The school closed on 31 Oct 1921, reopening on 19 July 1922 as a full-time school. It closed on 27 August 1962, briefly reopened and closed permanently in 1963.

In the  Talgai had a population of 106 people.

References 

Southern Downs Region
Localities in Queensland